Seaburn is a Tyne and Wear Metro station, serving the suburbs of Fulwell and Seaburn, City of Sunderland in Tyne and Wear, England. It joined the network on 31 March 2002, following the opening of the extension from Pelaw to South Hylton.

History
The station was opened by the London and North Eastern Railway on 3 May 1937. 

As well as East Boldon, Brockley Whins and Heworth, Seaburn was formerly served by rail services operating along the Durham Coast Line between Sunderland and Newcastle. Following the introduction of Tyne and Wear Metro services to Wearside in March 2002, Heworth is now the only remaining intermediate station served by rail services operating between Sunderland and Newcastle.

Along with other stations on the line between Fellgate and South Hylton, the station is fitted with vitreous enamel panels designed by artist, Morag Morrison. Each station uses a different arrangement of colours, with strong colours used in platform shelters and ticketing areas, and a more neutral palate for external elements.

Facilities 
Step-free access is available at all stations across the Tyne and Wear Metro network, with lifts and ramps providing step-free access to platforms at Seaburn. The station is also equipped with ticket machines, waiting shelter, seating, next train information displays, timetable posters, and an emergency help point on both platforms. Ticket machines are able to accept payment with credit and debit card (including contactless payment), notes and coins. The station is also fitted with smartcard validators, which feature at all stations across the network.

There is a small, free car park available, with nine parking spaces, plus two accessible spaces, as well as a taxi rank. There is also the provision for cycle parking, with five cycle pods available for use.

Services 
, the station is served by up to five trains per hour on weekdays and Saturday, and up to four trains per hour during the evening and on Sunday.

Rolling stock used: Class 599 Metrocar

References

Sources

External links
 
Timetable and station information for Seaburn

Railway stations in Great Britain opened in 1937
Railway stations in Great Britain opened in 2002
1937 establishments in England
2002 establishments in England
Former London and North Eastern Railway stations
Tyne and Wear Metro Green line stations
Transport in the City of Sunderland
Transport in Tyne and Wear
Sunderland
